The 138th Indiana Infantry Regiment served in the Union Army between May 27 and September 22, 1864, during the American Civil War.

Service 
The regiment was organized at Indianapolis, Indiana and mustered in on May 27, 1864. It was ordered to Tennessee and Alabama for railroad guard duty, until late September 1864. The regiment was mustered out on September 22, 1864. During its service the regiment lost eight men to disease and one to desertion.

The regiment was part of Indiana's quota of Hundred Days Men, which also included seven other regiments.

Companies and their counties of origin  

Men often enlisted in a company recruited in the counties where they lived, though not always. After many battles, companies might be combined because so many men were killed or wounded.

Company A - mostly from Miami County, Indiana
Company B - mostly from La Porte County, Indiana
Company C - mostly from Porter County, Indiana
Company D - mostly from La Porte County, Indiana and  St. Joseph County, Indiana
Company E - mostly from Marshall County, Indiana
Company F - mostly from Wabash County, Indiana
Company G - mostly from Wabash County, Indiana
Company H - mostly from St. Joseph County, Indiana
Company I - mostly from Wells County, Indiana, Huntington County, Indiana,& and Blackford County, Indiana
Company K - mostly from Cass County, Indiana

See also
 List of Indiana Civil War regiments

References

Bibliography 
 Dyer, Frederick H. (1959). A Compendium of the War of the Rebellion. New York and London. Thomas Yoseloff, Publisher. .

External links
 For a list of officers and non-commissioned officers, see 

Units and formations of the Union Army from Indiana
1864 establishments in Indiana
Military units and formations established in 1864
Military units and formations disestablished in 1864
1864 disestablishments in the United States